Anbe Vaa is a 2020 Indian Tamil language soap opera produced by Saregama Productions on Sun TV. The show stars Delna Davis and Viraat.

Plot 
Righteous and down to earth, Bhoomika's sole ambition is to provide well for her mother and sisters. On the other hand, Varun, a rich industrialist's overindulged son, enjoys his happy-go-lucky lifestyle. A chance encounter brings them together and despite starting off on a wrong foot, they soon fall in love and get married. Thus begins their life changing journey amidst many difficulties.

Cast

Main
 Viraat as Varun Krishna alias Varun Manoj Krishna: Bhoomika 's husband 
 Delna Davis in dual role as Boomika Varun Krishna:Varun Krishna's wife Nancy Deepak: Deepak's wife and Pappu's mother (Deceased)
 Arun Kumar Rajan as Dr. Deepak: Nancy 's husband and Pappu 's father

Recurring Cast
 Pooja Fiya / Mahalakshmi Shankar as Vasuki Madhavan: Varun's sister
 Kanya Bharathi as Parvathi Manoj Krishna: Vasuki and Varun's mother
 Sujatha Selvaraj as Eshwari Manickavasagam: Madhavan's and Veni's mother
 Anand as Manoj Krishna: Parvathi 's Wife, Vasuki and Varun's father.
 Rohan as Pappu: Nancy's son 
 Swathi Thara as Jenny: Nancy's sister
 VJ Dhanusek Vijayakumar as Jyothi alias Joe: Jenny's friend
 Monabethu as Lawyer Tamizharasi 
 Mohammed Salmaan as Ravi: Varun and Bhoomika's helper 
 J.Durai Raj as Madhavan Manickavasagam: Vasuki's husband  
 Queency Stanly as Neelaveni veni Manickavasagam: Madhavan's sister
 Mercy Leyal as Manjula: Manoj Krishna's sister and Janhvi's mother
 Sherin Jaanu as Janhvi: Varun's cousin 
 Sai Gopi as Sampath: Janhvi's father
 Sai Ashwin as Rahul: Varun's nephew 
 Baby Riya as Aishwarya: Varun's niece
 Sankavi Rajendran as Reshma: TV News reporter 
 Egavalli as Jayanthi: Vasuki's friend 
 Harish G as Chandru: Jayanthi's husband 
 Ramya Srinivasan as Swetha Ravi: Ravi's wife
 Subbulakshmi Rangan / Swathi Meenakshi as Shilpa
 Anuradha as Visalatchi: Manoj Krishna's aunt
 Birla Bose as Rajasekar: Bhoomika, Nancy, Karthika, Deepika and Vishwa 's father 
 Vinaya Prasad as Annalakshmi Rajasekar: Deepika and Karthika and Boomika's mother, Nancy's biological mother
Reshma Pasupuleti /Vinodhini as Vandana Rajasekar: Boomika's step-mother 
 Akshitha Ashok / Sushmitha Suresh  as Deepika Rajasekar: Boomika's first younger sister
 Ashaera / Preetha Suresh / Kokila Gopal as Karthika Rajasekar: Boomika's second younger sister 
 Kausalya Senthamarai / Geetha / Rajyalakshmi as Saraswathi: Varun's grandmother 
 Rani as Assistant commissioner of police ACP Chandrakantha
 VJ Sangeetha as Anjali: Vandana's younger sister
 Bharathi Mohan as Aarumugam: Varun's business partner  
 Krishna Kumar as ACP Raman: Shyam's cousin brother
 Sofiya Victor as Kavitha: Bhoomika's junior 
 Rekha Angelina as Indra: Kavitha's mother
 Bhuvana as Sub-inspector SI Meena  
 Swathi as Preethi: Shilpa's side kick
 Y. G. Mahendran as Colonel Ram
 Anuradha Krishnamoorthi as Seetha: Colonel Ram's  wife
 Neepa Vaman as Gomathi 
 Sabari as Rakesh 
 Vishwanth as Brahmanandam 
 Ashok Pandian as Ajay Krishna "AK": Manoj Krishna and Varun's rival 
 Vicky Vignesh as Shyam (deceased): Swetha's ex-fiancée
 Giri Dwarakish as Adiapaatham "Audi": Varun's P.A.
 Hemadayal as Ashwini Ashok: Boomika's best friend
 S.D. Ganesh as Ashok: Varun's best friend
 Pandi Kamal as Adithya: Varun and Boomika's best friend
 Akshara as Aishwarya: Adithya's sister
 --- as Vishwa Rajasekar: Vandhana and Rajasekar 's son

Special appearances 
 Aneesha as young Bhoomika 
 Master Vaibhav as young Varun
 Priyanka Nalkari as Roja Arjun
 Sibbu Suryan as Arjun Prathap
 Gayatri Shastry as Kalpana Prathap 
 Keerthana as Arulvakhu Vedhavalli 
 Raaghav as Rahul 
 Preetha as Baby 
 Akshaya Praba as Herself 
 Shwetha Bandekar as Chandra 
 Ambika as Chairman Janaki 
 Aarthi as herself
 Ganeshkar as himself 
 K. R. Vijaya as Ulganayagi
 Suja Varunee as herself
 Charu Hasan as himself 
 Komalam Charuhasan as herself

Crossover and special episodes 
 
 From 18 January to 24 January 2021 it had a Mahasangam with Kannana Kanne.
 On 8 August 2021 it aired a 1-hour special episode titled "Aadu Puli Aatam".
 On 10 September 2021 it aired a 1-hour special episode in view of Ganesh Chaturthi.
 On 21 November 2021 it aired a 1-hour special episode titled "Pulan Visaranai"
 On 8 May 2022 it aired a 1-hour special episode titled "Bhoomikaku Ennachu?"
 On 24 July 2022 it aired a 1-hour special episode titled "Poovum Puzhyalum"
 On 16 October it aired a 1-hour special episode titled "Kuzhandai Peru"

References

External links
 

Sun TV original programming
Tamil-language romance television series
Tamil-language television soap operas
2020 Tamil-language television series debuts
Television shows set in Tamil Nadu
Tamil-language television shows